Christopher Samuel Tugendhat, Baron Tugendhat  (born 23 February 1937) is a British Conservative Party politician, businessman, company director, journalist and author. He was a Member of Parliament from 1970 to 1977, then a member of the European Commission, and in 1993 was appointed as a life peer, with a seat in the House of Lords, in which he remains active.

Family background
Tugendhat was born in Marylebone, England. His father, Dr Georg Tugendhat (1898–1973), was born in Vienna, and came to Britain after the First World War to pursue a doctorate at the London School of Economics. He settled in Britain and married British-born Marie Littledale in 1934. Georg Tugendhat traced his paternal origins to the town of Bielitz in Silesia, which until 1918 was part of the Austro-Hungarian Empire but became part of Poland in 1920. His father was from a Jewish family, and converted to Catholicism.

Career
Tugendhat was educated at King's College School, Cambridge, Ampleforth College and Gonville and Caius College, Cambridge, then took up a career in journalism, becoming a features editor and leader writer for the Financial Times from 1960 to 1970. In 1970 he was elected as a Conservative Member of Parliament (MP) for the Cities of London and Westminster, remaining in the House of Commons until 1977, when he resigned after being appointed as a member of the European Commission. He was first appointed to the commission by a Labour government over the head of the nominee of the Conservative leader Margaret Thatcher, but four years later, as prime minister, Thatcher reappointed him, and he served as vice-president of the commission from 1981 until 1985.

On 3 December 1980, when he was leaving his home in Brussels, two bullets were fired at Tugendhat from a car, narrowly missing him; he called the attack "closer than I would have liked." The Provisional IRA claimed responsibility for the assassination attempt.

Following his role at the European Commission, Tugendhat was chairman of the Royal Institute for International Affairs (Chatham House) from 1986 to 1995, and of the Civil Aviation Authority from 1986 to 1991, when he was succeeded by Christopher Chataway. In 1993 he was appointed to the House of Lords as a life peer on the nomination of John Major.

He later went on to become the chairman of Abbey National, Blue Circle Industries, the European Advisory Board of Lehman Brothers, and the Imperial College Healthcare NHS Trust. He was also a director of Rio Tinto and Eurotunnel, among other companies.

Other work 
Tugendhat is a member of the Official Monetary and Financial Institutions Forum (OMFIF) Advisory Board, an independent financial think tank which serves as a neutral, non-lobbying platform for exchanges among official institutions and private sector counter-parties worldwide.

Personal life 
He married Julia Lissant Dobson; they have two sons, James (born 1971) and Angus (born 1974). His younger brother, Michael, was a judge of the High Court of England and Wales, and his nephew Tom Tugendhat has been the Conservative Member of Parliament for Tonbridge and Malling since May 2015.

Honours
Tugendhat was knighted in the 1990 Birthday Honours. On 15 October 1993 he was created a life peer as Baron Tugendhat, of Widdington in the County of Essex. In 1998 he became the Chancellor of the University of Bath, from which position he stood down in 2013, to be succeeded by Prince Edward, Earl of Wessex. He was chairman of Imperial College Healthcare NHS Trust, the UK's first academic health science centre, from 2007 until December 2011.

In 1998 he was awarded the honorary degree of Doctor of Laws by the University of Bath.

See also
 Tugendhat family

Publications
 Oil: The Biggest Business (1968) London. Eyre and Spottiswoode
 Multinationals (1971) London. Eyre and Spottiswoode
 Making Sense of Europe (1986) London. Viking
 Options for British Foreign Policy in the 1990s (Chatham House Papers) by Christopher Tugendhat and William Wallace (Nov 1988)
 Roy Jenkins, a Retrospective (2004); contributor, wrote Chapter 12.
 A History of Britain through Books 1900-1964 (2019) London. whitefox
 The Worm in the Apple (2022) London. Haus Publishing.

References

External links

  Hansard: Christopher  Tugendhat's contributions in Parliament
 Prospect article

1937 births
Living people
People educated at Ampleforth College
Alumni of Gonville and Caius College, Cambridge
English businesspeople
Knights Bachelor
Conservative Party (UK) MPs for English constituencies
Conservative Party (UK) life peers
British European Commissioners
Chancellors of the University of Bath
UK MPs 1970–1974
UK MPs 1974
UK MPs 1974–1979
Politics of the City of London
English Roman Catholics
English people of Austrian-Jewish descent
English people of Polish-Jewish descent
Council and directors of Chatham House
English people of Irish descent
Presidents of the Cambridge Union
European Commissioners 1977–1981
European Commissioners 1981–1985
Life peers created by Elizabeth II